Richard, Rick, or Dick Wallace may refer to:

Edgar Wallace (1875-1932), born Richard Wallace, British writer
Richard Alfred Wallace (1861–1935), Canadian politician and Northwest Territories MLA
Richard L. Wallace (born 1936), American educator and chancellor of the University of Missouri
Richard Wallace (cricketer) (born 1934), Australian cricketer
Richard Wallace (director) (1894–1951), American film director
Richard Wallace (fencer) (1872–1941), French Olympic fencer
Richard Wallace (journalist) (born 1960/1), British journalist, editor of The Daily Mirror newspaper
Richard Wallace (rugby league) (born 1944), rugby league footballer of the 1970s for Wales, and York
Richard Wallace (rugby union) (born 1968), Irish rugby player
Richard Wallace (scientist) (born 1960), American computer scientist, Chairman of A.L.I.C.E. Artificial Intelligence Foundation
Rick Wallace (born 1948), American TV director
Sir Richard Wallace, 1st Baronet (1818–1890), English art collector
Richard Wallace (bishop), New Zealand Māori Anglican bishop
Richard Wallace (author), author of Jack the Ripper, Light-Hearted Friend
Dick Wallace (1882–1925), American baseball player